Corné van Kessel (born 7 August 1991) is a Dutch professional cyclo-cross and road cyclist, who currently rides for UCI Cyclo-cross team Team Deschacht–Group Hens–Containers Maes.

Career
Van Kessel was born in Veldhoven. In October 2013, he extended his contract with the Telenet–Fidea team until the end of 2016.

Major results

Cyclo-cross

2008–2009
 2nd  UCI World Junior Championships
2009–2010
 1st  National Under-23 Championships
2011–2012
 Under-23 Gazet van Antwerpen
3rd Baal
2012–2013
 Under-23 Bpost Bank Trofee
1st Essen
1st Loenhout
3rd Baal
3rd Oostmalle
 2nd  UEC European Under-23 Championships
 2nd National Under-23 Championships
 UCI Under-23 World Cup
2nd Tábor
2nd Heusden-Zolder
 Under-23 Superprestige
3rd Gavere
2013–2014
 2nd National Championships
2014–2015
 2nd Surhuisterveen
 2nd Brabant
 UCI World Cup
3rd Cauberg
3rd Heusden-Zolder
 3rd Woerden
2015–2016
 1st Surhuisterveen
2016–2017
 1st Surhuisterveen
 1st Pfaffnau
 2nd National Championships
 2nd Brabant
 UCI World Cup
3rd Hoogerheide
 Soudal Classics
3rd Hasselt
 Brico Cross
3rd Kruibeke
 EKZ CrossTour
3rd Hittnau
 3rd Mol
2017–2018
 Soudal Classics
1st Hasselt
1st Leuven
3rd Niel
 UCI World Cup
2nd Waterloo
 2nd Overijse
 2nd Mol
 2nd Contern
 DVV Trophy
3rd Baal
 EKZ CrossTour
3rd Bern
 3rd Brabant
 3rd Woerden
2018–2019
 1st Mol
 1st Contern
 2nd Woerden
 3rd National Championships
 Superprestige
3rd Hoogstraten
 EKZ CrossTour
3rd Aigle
 3rd Overijse
 3rd Waterloo
2019–2020
 UCI World Cup
3rd Namur
 Superprestige
3rd Gieten
 DVV Trophy
3rd Loenhout
3rd Brussels
 3rd Gullegem
2020–2021
 X²O Badkamers Trophy
3rd Lille
2021–2022
 2nd National Championships
 X²O Badkamers Trophy
3rd Kortrijk

Road
2017
 3rd Internationale Wielertrofee Jong Maar Moedig
 4th Heistse Pijl
2022
 5th Schaal Sels

References

External links
 

1991 births
Living people
Dutch male cyclists
Cyclo-cross cyclists
People from Veldhoven
Cyclists from North Brabant